Berry Vrbanovic (born August 19, 1966) is a Croatian Canadian politician who has served as mayor of Kitchener, Ontario since the 2014 municipal election.

Vrbanovic attended St. Jerome's High School, and graduated from Wilfrid Laurier University with a BA in Political Science and a diploma in Business Administration. Prior to entering municipal politics, he worked in Kitchener's clerk's office and the information technology division.

Prior to his election to the mayoralty in 2014, he represented Ward 2 as a city councillor on Kitchener City Council from 1994 to 2014. He ran as an Ontario Liberal Party candidate in Kitchener Centre in the 1999 provincial election, losing to Wayne Wettlaufer.

References

External links
 Mayor Berry Vrbanovic
 Kitchener City Council

1966 births
Living people
Mayors of Kitchener, Ontario
Ontario Liberal Party candidates in Ontario provincial elections
Croatian emigrants to Canada
Wilfrid Laurier University alumni